5-Carboxamidotryptamine (5-CT) is a tryptamine derivative closely related to the neurotransmitter serotonin.

5-CT acts as a non-selective, high-affinity full agonist at the 5-HT1A, 5-HT1B, 5-HT1D, 5-HT5A, and 5-HT7 receptors, as well as at the 5-HT2, 5-HT3, 5-HT6 receptors with lower affinity. It has negligible affinity for the 5-HT1E and 5-HT1F receptors. 5-CT binds most strongly to the 5-HT1A receptor and it was once thought to be selective for this site. Recently, a close derivative of 5-CT, AH-494 has been shown to function as an agonist of 5-HT7, although being more selective over 5-HT1A. Structural study indicated residue Ser5x43 might play critical roles in the selectivity of 5-CT across the serotonin receptor family.

See also 
 2-Methyl-5-hydroxytryptamine
 5-Benzyloxytryptamine
 5-Methoxytryptamine
 α-Methyl-5-hydroxytryptamine
 Frovatriptan
 AH-494
 Acetryptine
 Sumatriptan

References 

Serotonin receptor agonists
Tryptamines
Carboxamides
Serotonin releasing agents